The 1931–32 NCAA men's basketball season began in December 1931, progressed through the regular season and conference tournaments, and concluded in March 1932.

Season headlines 

 The Border Conference began play, with five original members.
 Purdue senior guard John Wooden became the first three-time All-American.
 In February 1943, the Helms Athletic Foundation retroactively selected Purdue as its national champion for the 1931–32 season.
 In 1995, the Premo-Porretta Power Poll retroactively selected Purdue as its national champion for the 1931–32 season.

Conference membership changes

Regular season

Conference winners and tournaments

Statistical leaders

Awards

Consensus All-American team

Major player of the year awards 

 Helms Player of the Year: John Wooden, Purdue (retroactive selection in 1944)

Coaching changes

References